Pope Julius II (r. 1503–1513) created 27 cardinals in 6 consistories.

29 November 1503

 Clemente Grosso della Rovere
 Galeotto Franciotti della Rovere
 François Guillaume de Castelnau-Clermont-Ludève
 Juan de Zúñiga y Pimentel

1 December 1505

 Marco Vigerio della Rovere
 Robert Guibé
 Leonardo Grosso della Rovere
 Antonio Ferrero
 Francesco Alidosi
 Gabriele de' Gabrielli
 Fazio Giovanni Santori
 Carlo Domenico del Carretto
 Sigismondo Gonzaga

18 December 1506

 Jean-François de la Trémoille
 René de Prie
 Louis d'Amboise

May 1507

 Francisco Jiménez de Cisneros

11 September 1507

 Sisto Gara della Rovere

10 March 1511

 Christopher Bainbridge
 Antonio Maria Ciocchi del Monte
 Pietro Accolti
 Achille Grassi
 Francesco Argentino
 Matthäus Schiner
 Bandinello Sauli
 Alfonso Petrucci
 Matthäus Lang von Wellenburg

Sources

Julius II
College of Cardinals
16th-century Catholicism